Pehrson is a surname. Notable people with the surname include:

 Ingeborg Pehrson (1886–1950), Danish stage and film actress
 Jeff Pehrson (born 1967), American singer-songwriter
 Johan Pehrson (born 1968), Swedish politician
 Joseph Pehrson (1950–2020), American composer and pianist
 Robert Didrik Pehrson (1872–1965), Norwegian Nordic skier

See also
 Pearson (surname)
 Peerson
 Persson